G. Scott Morris (born March 6, 1954 in San Diego, California) is the founder and executive director of Church Health in Memphis, Tennessee. A medical doctor and ordained minister in the United Methodist Church, he is a leader in the field of faith and health and an advocate for the poor in U.S. society.

Dr. Morris is married to Mary Gilliland Morris and lives in Midtown Memphis.

Education and professional life
After graduating with his B.S. from the University of Virginia, Morris earned his Masters of Divinity from Yale Divinity School and then his medical degree from Emory University. Morris spent time working at a clinic called Crossroads in Raleigh, North Carolina before moving to Memphis to open the Church Health Center on September 1, 1987. The Church Health Center, now Church Health, began as a clinic for the working uninsured and has since expanded to include exercise and nutrition programming, healthcare advisory assistance for people enrolling in Church Health's MEMPHIS Plan, Medicare, Medicaid, and Affordable Care Act Marketplace plans, and a Congregational Health Promoter program. Morris also served an associate pastor at St. John's United Methodist Church in Memphis through 2016.

Morris received the Excellence in Medicine Award from the American Medical Association in 2008. Morris also received the Yale Divinity School Alumni Award for Distinction in Congregational Ministry in 1996.

Publications
Morris is the author of the books Relief for the Body, Renewal for the Soul and Health Care You Can Live With and he is the editor of two books of sermons, I Am the Lord that Heals You and Hope & Healing: Words from the Clergy of a Southern City. Morris writes a column for the Daily Memphian.

Dr. Morris' newest book is Care: How People of Faith Can Respond to Our Broken Health System (Erdmanns ).

Footnotes

External links
G. Scott Morris Blog 
Church Health  Official website
Bio of G. Scott Morris on the website of The Society of Entrepreneurs in Memphis
Letter to a Future Doctor, article on Church Health Reader, September 2009
Washington National Cathedral Sermon preached on April 22, 2001
Cancer Surgeon's Death Lesson for All of Us, in The Commercial Appeal, October 3, 2011

Living people
American Methodist clergy
1954 births
Yale Divinity School alumni
University of Virginia alumni
Emory University School of Medicine alumni